Kidmat Tzvi is an Israeli settlement organized as a moshav in the central Golan Heights. Located to the north of Katzrin, it falls under the jurisdiction of Golan Regional Council.

The international community considers Israeli settlements in the Golan Heights illegal under international law, but the Israeli government disputes this.

Etymology 
The settlement is named after Tzvi Isaacson, who was president of the Farmers' Association.

History
The area was overrun by Israeli Army in the Six-Day War and later occupied. The settlement was built in 1981, in the same year when Israeli unilaterally annexed the Golan region and imposed civil Israeli rule on the area.

In May 1989, members of the moshav invaded an apple orchard that belonged to a disbanded kibbutz Kela and prevented members of Kibbutz El Rom from entering it. The kibbutz El Rom claimed this orchard too. This invasion finished after some days after an agreement, and Kidmat Tzvi stayed with the orchard.

Near the kibbutz entrance is a memorial, Yad Otniel, dedicated to Israeli Air Force pilot Otniel Shamir, near the site where the plane was shot down by Syrian forces during the Six-Day War. His body was only recovered in 1974, and he was buried in his home, Dorot.

Kidmat Tzvi is a secular community, with no synagogue.

Economy
It is a productive agricultural community where chickens are raised and apples, grapes, pears, and cherries are grown. The town contains five boutique wineries with a combined output of over 130,000 bottles per annum.

References

Israeli settlements in the Golan Heights
Golan Regional Council
Moshavim
Populated places in Northern District (Israel)
Populated places established in 1981
Hitahdut HaIkarim
1981 establishments in the Israeli Military Governorate